Symmachia falcistriga is a butterfly species in the family Riodinidae. It is present in Bolivia, Brazil, and French Guiana.

Subspecies
Symmachia falcistriga falcistriga (Bolivia, Brazil: Amazonas)
Symmachia falcistriga meyi Brévignon, 1998 (French Guiana)

See also 
 List of butterflies of French Guiana

References

External links

 

Symmachia
Fauna of Bolivia
Fauna of Brazil
Lepidoptera of French Guiana
Butterflies described in 1910
Riodinidae of South America